Bogomil Petrov (born 21 November 1940) is a Bulgarian weightlifter. He competed in the men's lightweight event at the 1964 Summer Olympics.

References

1940 births
Living people
Bulgarian male weightlifters
Olympic weightlifters of Bulgaria
Weightlifters at the 1964 Summer Olympics
Place of birth missing (living people)